Ansar (also Romanized as Anşār) is a village in Howmeh Rural District, in the Central District of Maneh and Samalqan County, North Khorasan Province, Iran. At the 2006 census, its population was 430, in 113 families.

References 

Populated places in Maneh and Samalqan County